Dhari Rai Ditta is a village  in Fateh Jang Tehsil of Attock District in Punjab Province of Pakistan.

References

Villages in Attock District